Aleksandr Kravchenko (born 19 May 1973) is a Russian cross-country skier. He competed in the men's 30 kilometre classical event at the 1998 Winter Olympics.

References

External links
 

1973 births
Living people
People from Chelyabinsk Oblast
Russian male cross-country skiers
Olympic cross-country skiers of Russia
Cross-country skiers at the 1998 Winter Olympics
Sportspeople from Chelyabinsk Oblast